Count Frederick Charles Augustus of Lippe-Biesterfeld (20 January 1706 in Biesterfeld – 31 July 1781 in Friedrichsruh) was a Count of Lippe and Lord of Lippe-Biesterfeld, Sternberg and Schwalenberg and a Knight of the Order of the Red Eagle.

He was the eldest son of Rudolf Ferdinand of Lippe-Sternberg-Schwalenberg (17 March 1671 – 12 July 1736) and Louise Juliane of Kunowitz (21 August 1671 – 21 October 1754) and the grandson of Jobst Herman of Lippe-Biesterfeld.

Life 

Charles Frederick Augustus was the last Lord of Biesterfeld. During his reign, he had the manor's brewery moved from Schwalenberg to Biestereld and added a distillery, investing 6000 taler in this endeavour.

In 1763, he constructed a hunting lodge in the Sachsenwald forest, near Hamburg, named Friedrichsruh after himself. The nearby village was later renamed after the hunting lodge. However, the hunting lodge was demolished in 1859 to make room for a guest house. Otto von Bismarck was granted the Sachsenwald as a gratification for the foundation of the German Empire in 1871. He expanded the guest house to a castle, which was destroyed during World War II. The new manor house that took its place is still named Friedrichsruh Castle and home to the current Prince Bismarck.

The manor house and farm at Biesterfeld were demolished around 1820.

Marriage and issue 
Count Charles Frederick Augustus married on 7 May 1732 with Countess Barbara Eleonore of Solms-Baruth (30 October 1707 – 16 June 1744).  They had the following children:

 Wilhelmine Louise Constantine (15 June 1733 – 18 February 1766)
 married Count Seyfried of Promnitz (1734-1760), the son of Count Erdmann II of Promnitz
 married secondly Count John Christian of Solms-Baruth (1733-1800)
 Simon Rudolph Ferdinand (6 October 1734 – 23 May 1739)
 Charles Ernest Casimir (2 November 1735 – 19 November 1810)
 married Countess Ferdinande of Bentheim-Tecklenburg (1734-1779)
 Frederick William (25 January 1737 – July 31, 1803)
 married Elisabeth Johanna, Edle von Meinertzhagen (1752-1811) who inherited a small manor house at Oberkassel, Bonn, where the couple moved in 1770, and which would become the home to the Lippe-Biesterfeld family for the following 209 years 
 Marie Wilhelmine Henriette (5 December 1740 – 19 April 1741)
 Henry Louis (21 April 1743 – 16 September 1794)
 married Elisabeth  Kellner (1765-1794),  who was made Countess of Lippe-Falkenflucht in 1790
 Marie Barbara Eleonore (June 16, 1744 – June 16, 1776)
 married Count William of Schaumburg-Lippe (1724-1777)
 Ferdinand John Benjamin (June 16, 1744  – April 23, 1772)
 married Countess Wilhelmine of Schönburg-Lichtenstein (1746-1819)

Ancestry

References 
 Willy Gerking: Die Grafen zur Lippe-Biesterfeld, 2001

External links 
 Entry at geneanet.org

Footnotes 

House of Lippe
Counts of Lippe-Biesterfeld
1706 births
1781 deaths
18th-century German people